The combtoothed lanternshark (Etmopterus decacuspidatus) is a shark of the family Etmopteridae the only specimen, and holotype, being found from the South China Sea between the Viet Nam coast and Hainan Island, at a depth of between 510 and 690 m.  The holotype's length is 29 cm.

Reproduction is presumed to be ovoviviparous.

References

 
 Compagno, Dando, & Fowler, Sharks of the World, Princeton University Press, New Jersey 2005 

Etmopterus
Fish described in 1966